Weid is a river of Hesse and Thuringia, Germany. It flows into the Ulster near Tann. Weid is a very short river being about 1.7 miles (2.73 km) long. The headwaters of weid are formed when the Weidbach and the Mühlbach combine.

See also
List of rivers of Hesse
List of rivers of Thuringia

References

Rivers of Hesse
Rivers of Thuringia
Rivers of Germany